John de Taxster, sometimes erroneously called Taxter or Taxston, was a 13th-century English chronicler in England, of whose life nothing is known except that he was professed as a Benedictine at Bury St. Edmunds Abbey in the county of Suffolk, England on 20 November 1244 until his death. It is probable that he died in or about 1265, when his chronicle ceases.

Chronicle
Taxster's chronicle forms part of the Chronica Buriensis, or Chronicle of Bury St Edmunds, in which he was followed by two other writers. His sources, where borrowed from other chronicles, have been identified. Original writing starts at 1212. An edition of the chronicle for the period 1212 to 1301 was published in 1964 by Antonia Gransden. The chronicle for the period 1258–1263 was printed by H. R. Luard in his edition of Cotton (Rolls Series).

The work, which in the earlier part is compiled from Florence of Worcester, William of Malmesbury, and Ralph de Diceto, begins with the creation of the world. The description of contemporary events was subsequently used by John de Everisden, Johannes de Oxenedes, and Bartholomew Cotton. Taxster's chronicle exists in two manuscripts, one in the British Museum (Cott., Julius, A. 1.), the other in the College of Arms (Arundelian Manuscript, 6). A faulty manuscript for the years 1173–1265 was printed in 1849 for the English Historical Society, and passages relating to German affairs have been included by Pertz in "Mon. Germ. Hist.: Script.", XXVIII.

Bibliography 
John de Taxster: Chronica Abbreviata (down to 1265). Ed.

See also
Jocelyn de Brakelond, noted for his Chronicle of the Abbey of Bury St. Edmunds c. 1173 – 1202
Chronica Johannis de Oxenedes, a contemporary chronicle written at St Benet's Abbey, Norfolk.
Geoffrey de Runcey, a later chronicler from Bury St Edmunds.

References

13th-century English historians
English Benedictines
1260s deaths
John de Taxster
Year of birth unknown
English male non-fiction writers